Kim Hugo Leonel Niko Cesarion (born 10 July 1990) is a Swedish singer-songwriter of Guadeloupean and Greek origin. Kim Cesarion is a classically trained musician. He studied at Lilla Akademien, a highly acclaimed music school in Stockholm, and plays several instruments including the violin, piano, double bass, and viola, as well as drums. He is signed with RCA, Sony Music and Columbia.

Personal life
Cesarion was born in Stockholm to a Guadeloupean father and a Greek Cretan/Swedish mother. Both his father and his uncle were record producers. His sister is also a performer with Kaysha and the Sushiraw label.

Career

2011–12: Early beginnings
In 2011, Cesarion received a record deal with Aristotracks after meeting Arnthor Birgisson and Linus Andreen. He signed a distribution deal with Sony Music Sweden, whereas RCA UK will distribute his releases in Britain and Columbia Records in the United States).

2013–present: Breakthrough
Cesarion is known for his countertenor, which he uses in his single Undressed, released on 22 March 2013 and featured in the top 10 in 5 countries. His second single Brains Out was released on 6 September 2013. His debut album is scheduled for Spring 2014, co-written by Cesarion with Arnthor Birgisson, Gary Clark and Lukasz "Lukipop" Duchnowski, He released his debut studio album, Undressed, on 6 June 2014.

In 2018 he released the EP Bleed including the song with the same name and the previously released singles Water, Call On Me and Honest.

2020 Kim Ceasrion released a song with swedish lyrics called "Plåga mig" that was a project together with producer Theodor Arvidsson Kylin.

Discography

Albums

EPs
2018: Bleed EP

Singles

References

External links
Official website

1990 births
Living people
Swedish songwriters
English-language singers from Sweden
Singers from Stockholm
Swedish people of Greek descent
Swedish people of Guadeloupean descent
21st-century Swedish singers
21st-century Swedish male singers